The Ynglings were one of the oldest known Scandinavian dynasties.

Yngling or similar terms may also refer to one of the following:

Yngling (keelboat), a type of sailboat.
Ynglinga saga
Ynglingatal 
The Yngling, a novel and serial by John Dalmas

See also
Yuengling, the oldest operating brewing company in the United States
Jüngling, a German surname also spelled as Yingling or Yuengling
Ynglism, a neopagan Slavic religion